San Joaquin is a forested basaltic shield volcano forming the southeastern corner of Equatorial Guinea's Bioko Island. Its summit contains a small lake-filled caldera and its northeastern flank is home to a crater lake. The geologic history of San Joaquin is poorly known but the International Association of Volcanology and Chemistry of the Earth's Interior has classified the volcano as having been active in the last 2,000 years.

See also
 List of volcanoes in Equatorial Guinea

References

Shield volcanoes of Equatorial Guinea
Polygenetic shield volcanoes
Calderas of Equatorial Guinea